Rugosochroma is a genus of beetle in the family Cerambycidae. It was described by Vives & Lin in 2013 and contains the single species; Rugosochroma yunnanum.

References 

Callichromatini
Monotypic beetle genera